A degree (in full, a degree of arc, arc degree, or arcdegree), usually denoted by ° (the degree symbol), is a measurement of a plane angle in which one full rotation is 360 degrees.

It is not an SI unit—the SI unit of angular measure is the radian—but it is mentioned in the SI brochure as an accepted unit. Because a full rotation equals 2 radians, one degree is equivalent to  radians.

History

The original motivation for choosing the degree as a unit of rotations and angles is unknown. One theory states that it is related to the fact that 360 is approximately the number of days in a year. Ancient astronomers noticed that the sun, which follows through the ecliptic path over the course of the year, seems to advance in its path by approximately one degree each day. Some ancient calendars, such as the Persian calendar and the Babylonian calendar, used 360 days for a year. The use of a calendar with 360 days may be related to the use of sexagesimal numbers.

Another theory is that the Babylonians subdivided the circle using the angle of an equilateral triangle as the basic unit, and further subdivided the latter into 60 parts following their sexagesimal numeric system. The earliest trigonometry, used by the Babylonian astronomers and their Greek successors, was based on chords of a circle. A chord of length equal to the radius made a natural base quantity. One sixtieth of this, using their standard sexagesimal divisions, was a degree.

Aristarchus of Samos and Hipparchus seem to have been among the first Greek scientists to exploit Babylonian astronomical knowledge and techniques systematically. Timocharis, Aristarchus, Aristillus, Archimedes, and Hipparchus were the first Greeks known to divide the circle in 360 degrees of 60 arc minutes. Eratosthenes used a simpler sexagesimal system dividing a circle into 60 parts.

Another motivation for choosing the number 360 may have been that it is readily divisible: 360 has 24 divisors, making it one of only 7 numbers such that no number less than twice as much has more divisors . Furthermore, it is divisible by every number from 1 to 10 except 7. This property has many useful applications, such as dividing the world into 24 time zones, each of which is nominally 15° of longitude, to correlate with the established 24-hour day convention.

Finally, it may be the case that more than one of these factors has come into play. According to that theory, the number is approximately 365 because of the apparent movement of the sun against the celestial sphere, and that it was rounded to 360 for some of the mathematical reasons cited above.

Subdivisions
For many practical purposes, a degree is a small enough angle that whole degrees provide sufficient precision. When this is not the case, as in astronomy or for geographic coordinates (latitude and longitude), degree measurements may be written using decimal degrees (DD notation); for example, 40.1875°.

Alternatively, the traditional sexagesimal unit subdivisions can be used: one degree is divided into 60 minutes (of arc), and one minute into 60 seconds (of arc). Use of degrees-minutes-seconds is also called DMS notation. These subdivisions, also called the arcminute and arcsecond, are represented by a single prime (′) and double prime (″) respectively. For example, . Additional precision can be provided using decimal fractions of an arcsecond.

Maritime charts are marked in degrees and decimal minutes to facilitate measurement; 1 minute of latitude is 1 nautical mile. The example above would be given as 40° 11.25′ (commonly written as 11′25 or 11′.25).

The older system of thirds, fourths, etc., which continues the sexagesimal unit subdivision, was used by al-Kashi and other ancient astronomers, but is rarely used today. These subdivisions were denoted by writing the Roman numeral for the number of sixtieths in superscript: 1I for a "prime" (minute of arc), 1II for a second, 1III for a third, 1IV for a fourth, etc. Hence, the modern symbols for the minute and second of arc, and the word "second" also refer to this system.

SI prefixes can also be applied as in, e.g., millidegree, microdegree, etc.

Alternative units

In most mathematical work beyond practical geometry, angles are typically measured in radians rather than degrees. This is for a variety of reasons; for example, the trigonometric functions have simpler and more "natural" properties when their arguments are expressed in radians. These considerations outweigh the convenient divisibility of the number 360. One complete turn (360°) is equal to 2 radians, so 180° is equal to  radians, or equivalently, the degree is a mathematical constant: 1° = .

The turn (corresponding to a cycle or revolution) is used in technology and science. One turn is equal to 360°.

With the invention of the metric system, based on powers of ten, there was an attempt to replace degrees by decimal "degrees" in France and nearby countries, where the number in a right angle is equal to 100 gon with 400 gon in a full circle (1° =  gon). This was called  or grad. To end the confusion, the name gon was later adopted for the new unit. Although this idea of metrification was abandoned by Napoleon, grades continued to be used in several fields and many scientific calculators support them. Decigrades were used with French artillery sights in World War I.

It is approximately equal to one milliradian. This may be seen on a lining plane (an early device for aiming indirect fire artillery) dating from about 1900 in the St. Petersburg Museum of Artillery.

See also
 Compass
 Degree of curvature
 Geographic coordinate system
 Gradian
 Meridian arc
 Square degree
 Square minute
 Square second
 Steradian

Notes

References

External links

 , with interactive animation
 

Units of plane angle
Imperial units
Mathematical constants
Customary units of measurement in the United States